Leaford Bearskin (September 11, 1921 – November 9, 2012) was a Native American tribal leader and US Air Force officer. He was Chief of the Wyandotte Nation from 1983 to 2011.

Military service

During the Second World War, Captain Bearskin was the commander of a B-24 Liberator bomber, operating in the Pacific. In 1948 he assisted in the Berlin Airlift as a squadron commander. During the Korean War he again served as a squadron commander. In 1960 Bearskin retired from the service with the rank of lieutenant colonel. Amongst his many honors and citations were the Distinguished Flying Cross and the Medal for Humane Action.

Military awards
Command Pilot Insignia
Distinguished Flying Cross
Air Medal
Air Force Commendation Medal
Presidential Unit Citation
Air Force Outstanding Unit Award
American Defense Service Medal with star
American Campaign Medal
Asiatic-Pacific Campaign Medal with four campaign stars
World War II Victory Medal
Army of Occupation Medal with Berlin Airlift device
Medal for Humane Action
National Defense Service Medal
Korean Service Medal
Air Force Longevity Service Ribbon with four oak leaf clusters
Korean Presidential Unit Citation
United Nations Korea Medal
Korean War Service Medal

Chief of the Wyandotte Nation
In September 1983, Bearskin was elected Chief of the Wyandotte Nation. He served as Chief for 29 years, until his death in 2012.

The new Chief, Bill Friend, said of his predecessor: "His influence has not only been felt by our Nation, but throughout the state of Oklahoma and across the United States. He was a loyal and fierce advocate of tribal sovereignty and rights for not only the Wyandotte Nation, but for all tribes across this great nation."

References

External links
Bearskin USAF(Ret), Leaford, Lt Col at airforce.togetherweserved.com
Kansas Senate Resolution congratulating Bearskin for his service to the State and nation

1921 births
2012 deaths
Wyandot people
Native American leaders
United States Army Air Forces pilots of World War II
United States Air Force personnel of the Korean War
United States Air Force officers
Recipients of the Distinguished Flying Cross (United States)
Recipients of the Air Medal
People from Ottawa County, Oklahoma